HC Dinamo Yerevan is an ice hockey team in Yerevan, Armenia. They play in the Armenian Hockey League, the top level of ice hockey in Armenia.

History
The club was founded in 2000, and finished third in 2000-01 season. After the 2001-02 season was cancelled, Dinamo won three straight titles, in 2003, 2004, and 2005.

Since Urartu Yerevan joined the league for the 2005-06 season, Dinamo has not won another title, and their best result was second place in the 2007-08 and 2008-09 seasons.

Achievements
Armenian Hockey League champion (3): 2003, 2004, 2005.

Results
2000-01 3rd place
2001-02 No championship
2002-03 1st place
2003-04 1st place
2004-05 1st place
2005-06 3rd place
2006-07 4th place
2007-08 2nd place
2008-09 2nd place

External links
HC Dinamo Yerevan club profile on eurohockey.com

Ice hockey teams in Armenia
Ice hockey clubs established in 2000
Sport in Yerevan
2000 establishments in Armenia